Słoboda  (Sloboda) is a village in the administrative district of Gmina Kuryłówka, within Leżajsk County, Subcarpathian Voivodeship, in south-eastern Poland.

The village has a population of 150.

References

Villages in Leżajsk County